

References

V